Petersdorf may refer to the following places:

in Germany:
Petersdorf, Bavaria, in the district Aichach-Friedberg, Bavaria 
Petersdorf, Mecklenburg-Vorpommern, in the district Mecklenburg-Strelitz, Mecklenburg-Vorpommern
Petersdorf, Thuringia, in the district of Nordhausen, Thuringia
Petersdorf, Fehmarn, on the island of Fehmarn, Schleswig-Holstein
In Austria:
Petersdorf, Austria, in Styria
In the Czech Republic:
Vražné, in Moravian-Silesian Region
In Poland:
Piechowice, in Lower Silesian Voivodeship
In Romania:
Petreşti village, Sebeș, Alba County
Petriş village, Cetate Commune, Bistriţa-Năsăud County